Champion of the World is a 2021 Russian sports drama film written and directed by Aleksey Sidorov. The film tells the story of the rivalry between the Soviet Union's venerable sports artist, chess player Anatoly Karpov, who is competing against Viktor Korchnoi for the title of World Chess Championship.

It was theatrically released on 30 December 2021 by Central Partnership.

Plot 
The film tells about the famous World Chess Championship in 1978, against the background of which the chess player Anatoly Karpov loses his family, faces the betrayal and intrigues of the CIA, as well as pressure from the party.

Cast 
 Ivan Yankovsky as Anatoly Karpov
 Konstantin Khabensky as Viktor Korchnoi
 Vladimir Vdovichenkov as Pavel Trofimovich Gradov, Chairman of the USSR Sports Committee (prototype — Sergei Pavlovich Pavlov)
 Viktor Dobronravov as Sergei Maksimov, a KGB officer responsible for the security of Anatoly Karpov's team in Baguio (prototype — Vladimir Pishchenko)
 Viktor Sukhorukov as Viktor Baturinsky, director of the Central Chess Club, head of Anatoly Karpov's team leader
 Diana Pozharskaya as Veronika Karpova, Anatoly Karpov's wife (prototype — Irina Kuimova)

Other cast
 Fyodor Dobronravov as Anatoly Karpov's father
 Mikhail Teynik as Yuri Balashov, grandmaster, Anatoly Karpov's second
 Anatoly Kot as Igor Zaitsev, grandmaster, Anatoly Karpov's second
 Dmitry Iosifov as Mikhail Tal, Soviet chess player, eighth world champion, consultant to Anatoly Karpov
 Anton Bogdanov as Vasily Brykin, chef, Anatoly Karpov's team
 Dmitry Miller as Sevastyanov, Chairman of the USSR Chess Federation
 Aleksandr Filippenko as General Secretary Leonid Brezhnev
 David Brodsky as Boris Zelenin
 Armen Ananikyan as Tigran Petrosian, Soviet chess player, ninth world champion
 Vladimir Khalturin as Boris Spassky, Soviet chess player, tenth world champion
 Aleksandr Gorelov as Lev Polugaevsky, Soviet chess player
 Pekka Strang as Bobby Fischer, American chess player, eleventh world champion
 Josefin Asplund as Paola, Viktor Korchnoi's cohabitant
 John Warren as Raymond Keene, English chess player, Viktor Korchnoi's second
 Reilly Costigan as Michael Stean, English chess player, Viktor Korchnoi's second
 Pascal Durier as Max Euwe, Dutch chess player and functionary, fifth world champion and FIDE president
 Junsuke Kinoshita as Florencio Campomanes, FIDE Vice President
 Aleksandr Kan as Ferdinand Marcos, President of the Philippines

Production 
In 2019, the film was included in the list of 14 film projects that will receive financial support from the Cinema Foundation.

Filming 
Principal photography began in July 2020 and lasted until March 2021, taking place in Spain, Netherlands, Thailand, Philippines, and Moscow, Russia.

References

External links 
 

2021 drama films
2021 films
2020s Russian-language films
2020s sports drama films
Cultural depictions of Leonid Brezhnev
Films about chess
Films set in the Soviet Union
Russian sports drama films
Sports films based on actual events
Films produced by Nikita Mikhalkov